Le Pont du Nord is a 1981 French film directed by Jacques Rivette. The film stars Bulle Ogier and her daughter Pascale Ogier. It was released in France on 13 January 1982.

Plot
Marie (Bulle Ogier), a bank robber just out of prison, can no longer bear to live between four walls. Baptiste (Pascale Ogier) says she comes from somewhere else and intends to live by her own rules. (Note that as a French given name Baptiste is masculine, but is here played by an actress.)

Their paths cross three times in a matter of hours. Baptiste believes that it is fate; she must accompany Marie and protect her. Together, they investigate a surreal mystery that includes a briefcase stuffed with obsessive political intrigue, civic redevelopment, a huge mechanical, flame-spewing dragon and several characters all named Max. They invent a dangerous real-life game imagining Paris as a mysterious large scale board on which they play. The plot takes its structure from a French children's game, Game of the Goose (Jeu de l'oie), which overlays a makeshift design on a map of Paris.

Cast
 Bulle Ogier as Marie
 Pascale Ogier as Baptiste
 Pierre Clémenti as Julien
 Jean-François Stévenin as Max
 Benjamin Baltimore as Knife-Wielding Max
 Steve Baës as Mantle-Wearing Max
 Joe Dann as Monte Player
 Mathieu Schiffman as Hungarian
 Antoine Gurevitch as First Boy
 Julien Lidsky as Second Boy
 Marc Truscelli as Third Boy

Production notes
As usual, the story was jointly conceived with Rivette's collaborators, including Bulle Ogier, Pascale Ogier, Suzanne Schiffman and Jérôme Prieur, while the screenplay was written by Rivette. The short film Paris s'en va was made as a rehearsal in preparation for this film.

At least four film posters are seen in the film: The Big Country (1958), La Prisonnière (1968), The Silent Scream (1979), and Kagemusha (1980).

References

External links
 

1980s avant-garde and experimental films
1981 drama films
1981 films
French avant-garde and experimental films
French drama films
1980s French-language films
Films about children
Films directed by Jacques Rivette
Films produced by Barbet Schroeder
Films produced by Margaret Ménégoz
Films set in Paris
Films about gambling
1980s French films